Sir John Seymour Blake-Reed OBE (26 November 1882 – 8 March 1966) was a British judge who served in Colonial Egypt.

Biography
Blake-Reed was born in  Pembroke Dock, Pembrokeshire and educated at Manchester Grammar School and Jesus College, Oxford.  He was called to the bar by Gray's Inn in 1907, working on the Northern Circuit.  After military service in the First World War as a lieutenant in the Royal Navy Volunteer Reserve, Blake-Reed became a judge in Egyptian Native Courts (1919 to 1924), was President of the Land Court in Palestine in 1925, and a judge in the Mixed Court of Cairo (1926 to 1932).  His final position was as a judge of the Mixed Court of Appeal in Alexandria (1932 to 1949).  He was awarded the OBE in 1919 and knighted in 1950.  He was also made a Grand Officer of the Order of the Nile, and was made an Honorary Fellow of Jesus College in 1960.  Blake-Reed also published two books of Odes by Horace.

He was found dead on 8 March 1966 in his room at Jesus College, Oxford, aged 83.

References

1882 births
1966 deaths
People educated at Manchester Grammar School
Alumni of Jesus College, Oxford
Royal Naval Volunteer Reserve personnel of World War I
British barristers
Members of Gray's Inn
British colonial judges in Africa
Officers of the Order of the British Empire
Knights Bachelor
Lawyers awarded knighthoods
People from Pembroke Dock
Mandatory Palestine judges
British expatriates in Egypt